VirtualAcorn is the brand name of several commercial emulators of Acorn Computers computer hardware platforms.

Development

VirtualAcorn is developed by Graeme Barnes and Aaron Timbrell. It is a commercial version of the freeware emulator Red Squirrel, developed by Barnes. In 2004, supply of the software was moved to Timbrell's company 3QD Developments.

Virtual A5000

Virtual A5000 is an emulator of Acorn Computers A5000 computer. It included a copy of RISC OS 3.11. Virtual A5000 was released at BETT 2002 and stopped shipping in 2004.

It is now commercially available again from riscos.com with the latest version dated 2014.

VirtualRPC

VirtualRPC is an emulator of Acorn Computers' Risc PC computer.

Initially VirtualRPC was only available bundled with the MicroDigital Alpha range of PC laptops, but was later made available as a standalone product for sale. In 2003, the developers reached an agreement with RISCOS Ltd to license its OS.

VirtualRPC comes in four versions, with support for emulating ARM7 or ARM7 and StrongARM each coming with either RISC OS 4.02 or RISC OS Adjust 4.39.

Hardware bundles
Initially VirtualRPC was included on the MicroDigital Alpha range of PC laptops, and it has also been shipped by Advantage Six on the A5 series and by R-Comp in their RISCube/SpaceCube/RiscBook range.

References

External links
 http://www.drobe.co.uk/riscos/article.php?id=1600&nc=17
 http://www.drobe.co.uk/article.php?id=799 Drobe - Virtual License

Windows emulation software
MacOS emulation software
Cross-platform software
RISC OS emulators
Proprietary software